Peter Welz (born December 1, 1972 in Lauingen, West Germany) is a contemporary German artist based in Berlin. He has been exhibiting his work in video, sculpture and installations since 2003.

Life and work
Welz was born in Lauingen, Germany, in 1972. In the 1990s he studied at the National College of Art and Design (Dublin), the Chelsea College of Arts (London) and at the Cooper Union (New York City).His artistic works are on the one hand known for their kinetic experimental set-ups; on the other hand cinematic aspects play a central role. In addition to questions about the status of an image, the sculpture and the relationship between image and space are characteristics of his work in recent years. Welz' artistic work also reflects his confrontation with Samuel Beckett. He became known by a five-part video installation, which was developed in close collaboration with choreographer William Forsythe.

In 2020, Welz was one of 117 Berlin-based artists to be represented in the Berghain techno club’s Studio Berlin exhibition with the work Fuck Your Loneliness.Works by Peter Welz are located in the Goetz Collection, the Falckenberg Collection, in the Collection of the Museum für Moderne Kunst in Frankfurt, and in the Paris Centre Pompidou.

Scholarships
 2012 Artist-in-residence: Villa Aurora, Los Angeles, United States
 2008 Artist-in-residence: Centro Cultural Andratx, Majorca, Spain
 2007 MIT, List Visual Art Center, Boston, MA, US (AICA Awards, 2nd best thematic museum show)
 2006 Förderpreis GASAG, Berlin, Germany
 2005 Kaiserring Förderpreis, Museum für moderne Kunst, Goslar, Germany.
 2003 Konrad Adenauer Stipendium, EHF, Konrad Adenauer Stiftung, Berlin, Germany
 2003 Artist-in-residence: Irish Museum of Modern Art, Dublin, Ireland

Exhibitions
 2005 Mönchehaus Museum Goslar, Germany.
 2005 Renaissance Society, Chicago, IL, USA.
 2006 Museum der Gegenwart, Hamburger Bahnhof, Berlin, Germany (kuratiert von Stan Douglas & Christopher Eamon).
 2006 MIT, List Visual Art Center, Boston, MA, USA.
 2006 Louvre, Galerie de la Melpomène, Paris, France.
 2007 Weserburg Museum für moderne Kunst, Bremen, Germany.
 2009 National Gallery of Modern Art, Galleria Nazionale d’Arte Moderna, Rome, Italy.
 2013 Aichi Triennale 2013, Nagoya, Japan.
 2013 Municipal Museum of Art, Toyota, Aichi, Japan.
 2013 National Museum of Modern Art, Tokyo (MOMAT), Japan.
 2014 Galerie Crone: Ausstellung Malaparte, Berlin, Germany.
 2014/15 Galleria Fumagalli: Portraits & Installations (November 14, 2014 – January 6, 2015), Milan, Italy.
 2014/15 Weserburg Museum für moderne Kunst: Künstlerräume 02 (December 5, 2014 – May 31, 2015), Bremen, Germany.

References

Bibliography
 Carsten Ahrens ed.: Peter Welz | Weserburg | Museum für Moderne Kunst. Ausstellungskatalog, Heidelberg 2010, .
 Peter Welz: TO UNSAY. Ausstellungskatalog, Goslar 2005.

External links
 HP Peter Welz

1972 births
Living people
German contemporary artists
German installation artists
German conceptual artists